Night City or a variant, may refer to:

Music
 Night City, a 1988 album by Joe Hisaishi, see Joe Hisaishi discography
 "Night City", a 1968 song by Don Ellis off the album Shock Treatment
 "Night City (Tokyo)", a 1995 song by Black Rain off the album 1.0
 "Night City.Ambient", a remix of the song
 "Night City", a 2004 song by Bill Laswell off the album Version 2 Version: A Dub Transmission
 "Night City", a 2008 song by Jorn off the album Lonely Are the Brave
 "Night City", a 2010 song by The Sword off the album Warp Riders

Other uses
 Night City, a fictional setting of the Cyberpunk RPG series and connected media; see list of fictional towns and villages
 Night City, a 1982 poetry collection by Elena Kazantseva
 "The Night City", a 2002 horror short story by W. H. Pugmire

See also

 Summer Night City, a song by ABBA
 One Night City, a 2014 manga by Osamu Kobayashi (illustrator)
 
 Night and the City (disambiguation)
 Night in the city (disambiguation)
 City of night (disambiguation)
 Night (disambiguation)
 City (disambiguation)